The Knights of St Columba is a fraternal service order affiliated with the Catholic Church in Scotland and in England and Wales. Founded in Glasgow in 1919, the Knights are named in honour of Saint Columba, a 6th-century missionary descended from the Gaelic nobility of Ireland in modern County Donegal, who successfully evangelized both the Picts and Gaels of modern Scotland. The Knights describes themselves as dedicated to the principles of Charity, Unity and Fraternity. There are around 4,000 members of the KSC, in over 240 councils across Great Britain — it features in England, Scotland and Wales. Membership is limited to Catholic men aged 16 and over, and promotes the social doctrine of the Catholic Church.

The organisation is non-political and essentially democratic, does not admit women, and exists to support the mission of the Catholic Church. The KSC organisation is a member of the International Alliance of Catholic Knights. Founder of the Knights and first Supreme Knight was P. J. O'Callaghan.

Admission ceremonies usually take place in a Catholic parish during the celebration of Mass.

The group organises annual pilgrimages to Aylesford Priory in Kent and Carfin Lourdes Grotto near Motherwell in North Lanarkshire.

Organisation

At local level, members belong to a Council or Charter Council, led by the Grand Knight. The Charter Councils in an area (often corresponding to a Catholic Diocese) come together to form a Province, under the Provincial Grand Knight. Representatives of the Provinces meet at least once annually at the Supreme Council which governs the Order. The Supreme Knight presides over the Supreme Council.

Chronology of Supreme Knights

 1919–1922 Patrick Joseph O'Callaghan                
 1922–1929 Edward Henry
 1929–1933 William Bishop KSG
 1933–1936 Thomas Davis   
 1936–1945 William Loughrey  
 1945–1948 Thomas Leyland  
 1948–1951 Laurie Arnold  
 1951–1952 Daniel Kelly 
 1952–1955 Thomas McMenemy
 1955–1958 James Mitton MBE 
 1958–1961 Francis Mildner 
 1961–1964 Stuart Harper
 1964–1967 William Austin
 1967–1970 P. N. Scott 
 1970–1972 Michael May
 1972–1975 Martin Cairns
 1975–1978 Christopher Seneviratne
 1978–1981 Anthony Rouse KCSG KHS
 1981–1984 P. Layden KCSG KHS
 1984–1987 Walter Downey
 1987–1990 Francis Redmond KCSG
 1990–1993 Anthony Bateman KSG
 1993–1996 Anthony Britten KCSG KCHS
 1996–1999 Kenneth Hargreaves KSG
 1999–2002 Anthony Britten KCSG KCHS
 2002–2005 Anthony Doherty KSG 
 2005–2008 John Doran KSG
 2008–2011 Jonjo McDonagh KSG
 2011–2014 Ron Lynch KSG
 2014–2017 Charlie McCluskey KSG
 2017–2021 Bertie M. Grogan KSG
 2021–present Henry Welsh

Ecclesiastical advisers
Malcolm McMahon OP, Archbishop of Liverpool
Tom Neylon, Auxiliary Bishop of Liverpool (12th ecclesiastical adviser)

See also

 Knights of Columbus
 Knights of Columbanus

Sources

Notes

References

External links
 Knights of Saint Columba

Saint Columbus
Religious organizations established in 1882
Catholic Church in North America